Polk County High School (PCHS) is a public high school located near Benton, Tennessee. It is one of two high schools in Polk County and the Polk County Schools district, the other being Copper Basin High School, with which it maintains a rivalry.

Athletics
Polk County High is a member of the Tennessee Secondary School Athletic Association (TSSAA). Sports include baseball, basketball, cheerleading, cross country, football, golf, soccer, softball, tennis, track and field, volleyball, and wrestling. Girls' basketball won a state championship in 1981.

References

Education in Polk County, Tennessee
Public high schools in Tennessee